Ramon di Clemente (born 2 May 1975) is a South African rower and Olympic medalist. He competes in the coxless pair event with his boat partner of the past few years, Donovan Cech. They won the bronze medal in the 2004 Summer Olympics in Athens.

In 2008, Donovan Cech was replaced by Shaun Keeling due to a persistent lower-back injury. After only a few months rowing together Ramon di Clementi and Shaun Keeling went on to make the A final at the Olympics. After a closely fought race they were narrowly beaten by 4 crews and came in fifth.

Achievements 
 2005 – World Championships silver medal
 2004 – 2004 Summer Olympics bronze medal
 2003 – World Championships bronze medal
 2002 – World Championships silver medal
 2001 – World Championships bronze medal
 2008, 2007, 2005 & 2004 – winner of Silver Goblets & Nickalls' Challenge Cup at the Henley Royal Regatta
 A finalist at the 2000 Sydney Olympics and 2008 Beijing Olympics

Affiliations
 TuksSport – University of Pretoria, South Africa

References

1975 births
Living people
South African male rowers
Olympic rowers of South Africa
Olympic bronze medalists for South Africa
Rowers at the 2000 Summer Olympics
Rowers at the 2004 Summer Olympics
Rowers at the 2008 Summer Olympics
Olympic medalists in rowing
Medalists at the 2004 Summer Olympics
South African people of Italian descent
Italian South African
World Rowing Championships medalists for South Africa
21st-century South African people